Full-Tilt Boogie is a 1997 documentary film directed by Sarah Kelly that chronicles the production of the 1996 film From Dusk till Dawn.

It features extensive interviews with the cast and crew covering a variety of topics related to the film. This includes the International Alliance of Theatrical Stage Employees protesting the non-union status of the film. The production crew for the documentary are also non-union.

Cast
Robert Rodriguez
Quentin Tarantino
Lawrence Bender
George Clooney
Harvey Keitel
Juliette Lewis
Salma Hayek
Fred Williamson
Tom Savini
Michael Parks
Elizabeth Avellán
Robert Kurtzman
Gregory Nicotero

Poster
When the time came for the poster of From Dusk till Dawn to be created, Rodriguez, who has final approval for all such merchandise relating to his films, commissioned a design from one of his favorite artists, fantasy painter Frank Frazetta. The piece was ultimately not used, but its influence can clearly be seen on the poster for Full Tilt Boogie.

Reception 
Despite being released two years after its subject – the popular film From Dusk Till Dawn – Full-Tilt Boogie was well received, with an 88% on review aggregation website Rotten Tomatoes. David Stratton of Variety Film Reviews remarked, "A bit late in the day, but nevertheless welcome."

It was praised by Ryan Cracknell of the Apollo Guide for being "a tribute to the people who work behind the camera, but don't normally compete for golden statues on Oscar night."

References

External links

1997 films
Documentary films about films
From Dusk till Dawn (franchise)
American documentary films
1997 documentary films
Quentin Tarantino
Documentary films about labor relations in the United States
1990s English-language films
1990s American films